

Jagdverband 44 (JV 44) was a German air unit during World War II. It was formed during the last months of World War II to operate the Messerschmitt Me 262 jet fighter.

The commander of JV 44 was General Adolf Galland, the former General der Jagdflieger (General of Fighter pilots) who had recently been sacked from his staff post by Hermann Göring for criticizing the operational policies, strategic doctrine, and tactics mandated by the Luftwaffe High Command in the "Fighter Pilots' Revolt". Galland was charged with setting up a small Me 262 unit  to demonstrate the capabilities of the jet fighter.

JV 44 comprised a core of experienced pilots (Experten) chosen from Galland's former staff or recruited from units which had been disbanded or were being re-equipped. JV 44 performed well during its brief history, achieving a 4-to-1 kill ratio.  However, it had relatively few operational jet planes available for any single sortie and was repeatedly forced to relocate due to the approach of Allied ground forces. Its complement included 50 pilots and 25 airplanes.

Galland was injured on 26 April and Heinrich Bär assumed command.

References

Notes

Bibliography

Further reading 

Luftwaffe Special Commands
Military units and formations established in 1945
Military units and formations disestablished in 1945